The Rohrbach Ro X Romar was a German long-range commercial flying-boat and the last aircraft designed and built by Rohrbach Metall Flugzeugbau GmbH.

Development
The Romar was the final production aircraft from Rohrbach and was a monoplane flying-boat with a crew of four or five and two cabins for a total of 12 passengers. The revised Romar II could accommodate 16 passengers. It had three BMW VIUZ Vee piston engines strut mounted above the wing. The first aircraft flew on 7 August 1928 and was unveiled at the Berlin Aviation Exhibition in October 1928. Only four aircraft were built, three were used on Baltic services by Deutsche Luft Hansa and one was supplied to the French Navy.

Operators

French Navy

Deutsche Luft Hansa

Specifications

See also

References

Further reading

External links

Istituto Luce Rohrbach Romar under construction 
Rohrbach X "Romar"

1920s German airliners
Flying boats
Romar
Three-engined pusher aircraft
High-wing aircraft
Aircraft first flown in 1928